Mount Willing may refer to the following:

 In Antarctica
 Mount Willing, Antarctica, a mountain in the Prince Charles Mountains

 In the United States
 Mount Willing, Alabama
 Mount Willing, South Carolina, a populated place and former cotton plantation in Saluda County, South Carolina